Joackim Jørgensen; (born 20 September 1988) is a Norwegian professional footballer who plays for IK Start in the Norwegian 1. divisjon.

He is a defensive playmaker and is known for his passing and being a hard-working and energetic midfielder. He is a very defensive minded player, being able to pick up balls from the middle of the field and make something happen.
Several Norwegian clubs have shown interest in him(Rosenborg BK, Molde) but he shunned all of the team and chose to play in Sweden for IF Elfsborg.

Early years
He was born in Yven and grew up in Bærum and already when he was a child he had a genuine interest in football. Jørgensen started in his home town club Yven IF and played there until he was 14 years old until he moved to Sarpsborg youth section which introduced a new focus on young players. Joackim stayed in the club and developed a lot as a player and the age of 18 he made his debut for Sarpsborg's first team.

Career

Sarpsborg 08
His senior career started out in FK Sparta Sarpsborg (now Sarpsborg 08), where he in his debut season played a whole season in the Adeccoligaen, 2007. He played 26 matches and scored one goal, but during the season he played on various positions. Season 2008 he was on a loan to Lørenskog IF for one year where he got at more offensive role. He did a great season at Lørenskog and now formerly Sarpsborg 08 wanted him back. Season 2009 and 2010 Jørgen played as a defensive midfielder. He became quickly a very important player for Sarpsborg 08 in the Adecceligaen. He was one of the key players when Sarpsborg 08 advanced to Tippeligaen 2011, first division in Norway. In the following season in Tippeligaen, Sarpsborg got relegated back to Adeccoligaen, but Jørgensen's performance on the field made other clubs in Norway and Scandinavia interested in the player. Clubs like Rosenborg BK, Molde FK, Stabæk Fotball wanted to sign contract with him. Joackim also declared that he wanted to move to a better club, he felt that he wanted to develop even more.
His goal against Viking on 30 June 2011; an amazing long shoot from 31 metres was nominated as goal of the year in the Tippeliga.

IF Elfsborg
Jørgensen was sold to IF Elfsborg on 20 November 2011 for about £300,000-£600,000 making this the biggest deal in the history of Sarpsborg 08. The club president later on confirmed the deal and Jørgensen said that he had never worked with such a professional club as Elfsborg. He stated that the reasoning behind choosing Elfsborg ahead of other Norwegian clubs was Jörgen Lennartssons qualities as a manager and the way Elfsborg play football.

Joackim's comments on the transfer were: "Elfsborg are probably the team that will bring me the most and I think I can perform well at this club. They have a good staff of coaches and a lot of good players. I like the way Elfsborg want to play, they like to play the ball. I like the passing mentality. I hope I can contribute in the penalty area, both offensively and defensively."

The new head coach of Elfsborg, Jörgen Lennartsson was the one who scouted Joackim already during his time at Stabæk. He commented on Joackim: "He is a type of player I think we are missing a little. He is a Jari Illola-type, slow but still skilled. I followed him during my time at Stabæk and he has done an incredibly good job at Sarpsborg. He is a typical two-way player and he's really fit. 28 starts in Tippeligaen this season. I think he has a very good shot and is good in his main game. He is a good team player and a great guy, I'm very happy that we could bring him to Elfsborg."

IK Start
On 6 August 2018, Jørgensen announced, that he would join IK Start after the season.

Personal life
The night before 25 April 2010, the same day as Sarpsborg 08 was meeting Follo in Adeccoligaen, Jørgensen was caught for driving under the influence.

Career statistics

Honours
Elfsborg
 Allsvenskan: 2012

References

1988 births
Living people
People from Sarpsborg
Association football central defenders
Association football midfielders
Norwegian footballers
Eliteserien players
Norwegian First Division players
Norwegian Second Division players
Allsvenskan players
IK Start players
Sarpsborg 08 FF players
IF Elfsborg players
Viking FK players
Norwegian expatriate footballers
Expatriate footballers in Sweden
Norwegian expatriate sportspeople in Sweden
Sportspeople from Viken (county)